372 Pages We'll Never Get Back is a podcast series created by Michael J. Nelson (of Mystery Science Theater 3000 and RiffTrax fame) and Conor Lastowka (author of The Pole Vault Champion of the Universe and writer for RiffTrax). Beginning in 2017 with Ernest Cline's Ready Player One (the titular 372-page book), the podcast discusses literature that the two men "are probably going to hate," though they have stated they end up enjoying some books much more than others.

Episodes

Reception

In 2017, Marc Hershon of Vulture.com wrote, "While I actually enjoyed breezing through Cline's tribute to pop culture of latter half of the 20th century, I can't deny a certain pleasure in reliving it through 372 Pages comedically brutal thrashing."

The A.V. Club's Mike Vanderbilt interviewed Nelson and Lastowka in 2018.

In 2019, Alice Nuttall of Book Riot wrote, "Nelson and Lastowka spin bad books into gold. Listening to an episode is like sitting in on a reading group run by people who are much funnier than you are." In 2020 Emily Martin compared it to How Did This Get Made?.

In 2020, E. A. Henson of Biff Bam Pop! reviewed it positively, saying "372 Pages manages to avoid those common podcast pitfalls and hilarious[ly] transcend the source material" and that "[T]hese books are so amazingly bad that they almost seem like some kind of outsider art."

References

External links

Audio podcasts
Comedy and humor podcasts
2017 podcast debuts
Literary criticism
American podcasts
Patreon creators
Book podcasts